Hotel Grand Stark is a 57-room hotel in Portland, Oregon. The project is a partnership between the real estate firms Urban Development + Partners and Beam Development.

Description
The hotel has two restaurants.

History
Hotel Grand Stark opened in May 2021.

References

External links
 

2021 establishments in Oregon
Buckman, Portland, Oregon
Hotels established in 2021
Hotels in Portland, Oregon